Junction Elementary School District is a public school district based in Shasta County, California, United States.

References

External links
 

School districts in Shasta County, California